This is a list of women's Test cricket records; that is, record team and individual performances in women's Test cricket. Records for the short form of women's international cricket, One Day Internationals, are at List of women's One Day International cricket records.

Cricket is, by its nature, capable of generating large numbers of records and statistics. Women's Test cricket has been played since 1934–35 with essentially the same rules as are played today, and therefore many comparisons can be made of teams and individuals through these records.

Listing criteria
In general the top five are listed in each category (except when there is a tie for the last place among the five, when all the tied record holders are noted).

Listing notation 
Team notation
 (300–3) indicates that a team scored 300 runs for three wickets and the innings was closed, either due to a successful run chase or if no playing time remained.
 (300–3 d) indicates that a team scored 300 runs for three wickets, and declared its innings closed.
 (300) indicates that a team scored 300 runs and was all out.

Batting notation
 (100) indicates that a batsman scored 100 runs and was out.
 (100*) indicates that a batsman scored 100 runs and was not out.

Bowling notation
 (5–100) indicates that a bowler has captured 5 wickets while conceding 100 runs.

Currently playing
 Current Test cricketers are shown in bold.

Team records

Team wins, losses and draws

Matches played

Source: Cricinfo. Last updated: 30 June 2022.

Result records

Greatest win margins (by innings)

Greatest win margins (by runs)

Narrowest win margins (by wickets)

Narrowest win margins (by runs)

Tied Tests

There have been no tied matches in women's Test cricket.

Follow On Records (Victory after Following-on)

No team has won a match after being made to follow-on.

Team scoring records

Individual records

Individual records (batting)

Career runs

Innings or series

Highest proportion of runs in a completed innings total

Half Centuries, Centuries and Double Centuries

Individual records (bowling)

Career

Series

Innings

Match

Individual records (fielding)

Most catches in Test career

Individual records (wicket-keeping)

Individual records (other)

Partnership records

Highest wicket partnerships

Highest partnerships

See also

Cricket statistics

Notes and references

General references
 Cricinfo.com
 Cricketarchive.com 
 Howstat.com

Cricket records and statistics
Women's cricket-related lists